Roi Et is one of Thailand's seventy-six provinces (changwat) lies in central northeastern Thailand also called Isan. Neighboring provinces are (from north clockwise) Kalasin, Mukdahan, Yasothon, Sisaket, Surin, and Maha Sarakham.

Toponymy
The name of the province literally means 'one hundred and one'. Correctly, the number should be "eleven", as the province was named after its eleven ancient gates built for its eleven vassal states. In ancient times, the number "eleven" was written "๑๐๑" (101) and the provincial name was written accordingly. Later, people took "๑๐๑" to mean 'one hundred and one' and have since then called it "Roi Et".

Geography
Most of the province is covered by plains about 130–160 meters above sea level, drained by the Chi River. In the north are the hills of the Phu Phan mountain range. The Yang River is the major watercourse. In the south is the Mun River, which also forms the boundary with Surin. At the mouth of the Chi River, where it enters the Mun River, a floodplain provides a good rice farming area.

History
The area was already settled at the time of the Khmer empire, as several ruins show. However, the main history of the province began when Lao people from Champasak settled near Suwannaphum during the Ayutthaya Kingdom. In the late-18th century, King Taksin moved the city to its present site, then called Saket Nakhon.

Symbols
The provincial seal shows the shrine of the city pillar, which is in the artificial lake Bueng Phalan Chai. The spirit of the shrine, Mahesak, is revered by local people.

The provincial tree is Lagerstroemia macrocarpa.

Transportation

Road
Route 214 leads north to Kalasin and south to Kaset Wiset, Surin, and Prasat. Route 2044 leads east to Phon Thong. Route 23 leads west to Maha Sarakham and Ban Phai, and east to Yasothon and Ubon Ratchathani. Route 215 leads south to Suwannaphum and the border with Surin province.

Air
Roi Et is served by Roi Et Airport to the north of the town.

Health 
Roi Et's main hospital is Roi Et Hospital, a regional hospital operated by the Ministry of Public Health.

Administrative divisions

Provincial government

The province is divided into 20 districts (amphoes). The districts are further divided into 193 subdistricts (tambons) and 2,311 villages (mubans).

Local government
As of 26 November 2019 there are: one Roi Et Provincial Administration Organisation and 73 municipal (thesaban) areas in the province. Roi Et has town (thesaban mueang) status. Further 72 subdistrict municipalities (thesaban tambon). The non-municipal areas are administered by 129 Subdistrict Administrative Organisations - SAO (ongkan borihan suan tambon).

Human achievement index 2017

Since 2003, United Nations Development Programme (UNDP) in Thailand has tracked progress on human development at sub-national level using the Human achievement index (HAI), a composite index covering all the eight key areas of human development. National Economic and Social Development Board (NESDB) has taken over this task since 2017.

Gallery

References

External links

Province page from the Tourist Authority of Thailand

Website of province (Thai only)

 
Isan
Provinces of Thailand